Cheles was the name of a Mayan chiefdom of the Yucatán Peninsula, in the present day southeastern Mexico.

Its demise occurred after the arrival of the Spanish conquest of the Yucatán and subsequent colonization efforts in the Yucatán Peninsula region in the 16th century.

See also
Spanish conquest of the Aztec Empire
Spanish conquest of Petén — southern Maya.

References

Mayan chiefdoms of the Yucatán Peninsula
History of Yucatán
16th-century disestablishments in the Maya civilization
16th-century disestablishments in Mexico